Sherae'a Eboni "Rae" Moore is an American politician from the state of Delaware. A Democrat, Moore has represented the 8th district of the Delaware House of Representatives, which encompasses a parts New Castle County, since November 2020.

Early life 
Moore attended school in Appoquinimink School District and graduated from Middletown High School. She then became the first in her family to finish college when graduated cum laude from Delaware State University, where she earned her Bachelor of Arts in English. Moore then earned her Master of Arts in public policy and administration.

In 2016, Moore served as the deputy regional director for the Delaware Democratic Party in Kent County. She also worked as a legislative assistant for the Delaware House of Representatives. After working as a public servant, Moore became a teacher.

Delaware House of Representatives 
In 2020, Moore won a three-way primary with 41.8% of the vote to replace retiring incumbent S. Quinton Johnson. Moore then defeated Republican Dan Zitofsky with 7,567 votes (57%).

References 

Living people
Year of birth missing (living people)
New Castle County, Delaware politicians
Women state legislators in Delaware
Democratic Party members of the Delaware House of Representatives
21st-century American women